The 1896 Los Angeles mayoral election was held on Monday December 7, Meredith P. Snyder was elected.

Results

References

External links
 Office of the City Clerk, City of Los Angeles

1896
1896 California elections
Los Angeles
1890s in Los Angeles